Theres Obrecht (born 10 January 1944) is a Swiss alpine skier. She competed in three events at the 1964 Winter Olympics.

References

1944 births
Living people
Swiss female alpine skiers
Olympic alpine skiers of Switzerland
Alpine skiers at the 1964 Winter Olympics
Sportspeople from Bern
Universiade gold medalists for Switzerland
Universiade medalists in alpine skiing
Competitors at the 1966 Winter Universiade
20th-century Swiss women